The 2019 Dutch Indoor Athletics Championships was the 48th edition of the national championship in indoor track and field for the Netherlands. It was held on 16–17 February at the Omnisport Apeldoorn in Apeldoorn. A total of 24 events (divided evenly between the sexes) were contested over the two-day competition.

Results

Men

Women

References

Results
 Tijdschema AA Drink NK Indoor Senioren 2019 . Royal Dutch Athletics Federation. Retrieved 2019-07-14.

Dutch Indoor Athletics Championships
Dutch Indoor Athletics Championships
Dutch Indoor Athletics Championships
Dutch Indoor Athletics Championships
Sports competitions in Apeldoorn